Basharat Peer (born 1977) is a Kashmiri journalist, script writer, and author. 

Peer spent his early youth in the Kashmir Valley before shifting to Aligarh and then, Delhi for higher education. In August 2006, he relocated from India to New York City in the United States, where he is currently based as an opinion-editor at The New York Times.

Early and personal life 
Peer was born in Seer Hamdan in the Anantnag district of the erstwhile Indian state of Jammu and Kashmir into a Kashmiri Muslim family. He did his early schooling from Jawahar Navodaya Vidyalaya Aishmuqam, an educational institution located near the city of Anantnag, and attended Aligarh Muslim University as well as the University of Delhi for higher education in the fields of political science and law, respectively. Peer also attended the Graduate School of Journalism at Columbia University in the United States.

Peer's father is a retired officer of the Jammu and Kashmir Administrative Service. He married Ananya Vajpeyi—a Delhi-based academician of Hindu–Sikh background—in 2013, following an eight-year-long courtship.

Career 
Peer started his career as a reporter at Rediff and Tehelka. In his early career he was based in Delhi. He has worked as an Assistant Editor at Foreign Affairs and was a Fellow at Open Society Institute, New York. He was a Roving Editor at The Hindu. He has written extensively on South Asian politics for Granta, Foreign Affairs, The Guardian, FT Magazine, The New Yorker, The National and The Caravan.

He is the author of Curfewed Night, an eyewitness account of the Kashmir conflict, which won the Crossword Prize for Non-Fiction and was chosen among the Books of the Year by The Economist and The New Yorker. Peer ran the "India Ink" blog on the digital edition of The New York Times.

Notable work
Peer was the script writer along with Vishal Bhardwaj for the 2014 Bollywood film Haider, in which he also made a special appearance.
He is also known for his literary pieces. His open letter to Indians under the title of Letter to an unknown Indian started a literary debate on kashmir dispute.

Publications

See also
 List of Indian writers
 Mirza Waheed

Notes

References

External links 
 
 Video: Basharat Peer discusses his book Curfewed Night at the Asia Society, New York. 12 April 2010 Article about Basharat Peer adapting and co-writing the screenplay of the movie Haider, an adaptation of Hamlet set in mid-1990s Kashmir and directed by Vishal Bhardwaj. 
 Hindustan Times

1967 births
Living people
20th-century Indian essayists
Writers about the Kashmir conflict
Columbia University Graduate School of Journalism alumni
Indian Muslims
Indian columnists
Indian male essayists
Indian male journalists
Indian political writers
Journalists from Jammu and Kashmir
Indian people of Kashmiri descent
American people of Kashmiri descent
The New Yorker people
People from Aligarh
People from Anantnag district
People from Anantnag
Aligarh Muslim University alumni
Delhi University alumni
20th-century Indian screenwriters